Mirage a Trois is the second album of the American jazz group Yellowjackets, released in 1983. The album reached a peak position of number 145 on the Billboard 200 and number 7 on Billboard Jazz Albums chart.  It was nominated for the Grammy Award for Best Jazz Fusion Performance in 1984.

Track listing
 "Claire's Song" (Russell Ferrante) - 5:11
 "Top Secret" (Jimmy Haslip, Ferrante, Ricky Lawson) - 6:11
 "I Got Rhythm" (George Gershwin, Ira Gershwin) - 4:34
 "Pass It On" (Ferrante) - 6:14
 "Goin' Home" (Ferrante) - 5:38
 "Man in the Moon" (Haslip, Ferrante) - 4:38
 "Elamar" (Mike Miller) - 4:10
 "Nimbus" (Ferrante) - 4:46

Personnel 

Yellowjackets
 Russell Ferrante – keyboards, acoustic piano 
 Jimmy Haslip – bass guitar
 Ricky Lawson – drums

Additional musicians
 Robben Ford - guitar (2, 4, 5 & 6)
 Scott Page – sequencing (1)
 Anthony McShear – sequencing (1)
 James Newton Howard –  synthesizer programming, arrangements  (7 & 8)
 Mike Miller – guitar (3, 7 & 8)
 Richard Elliot – lyricon (all except 2), saxophone (6)
 Paulinho da Costa – percussion
 Max Carl – vocals (3)
 Randy Crawford – vocals (3)
 Yolan Fischer – vocals (3)
 Bruce Hornsby – vocals (3)
 Bill LaBounty – vocals (3)
 Brenda Russell – vocals (3)
 Marilyn Scott – vocals (3)
 Pauline Wilson – vocals (3)

Production 
 Tommy LiPuma – producer 
 Norm Kinney – recording, mixing 
 Don Koldon – assistant engineer 
 Peggy McCreary – assistant engineer 
 Richard McKernan – assistant engineer 
 Bernie Grundman – mastering 
 Simon Levy – art direction 
 Jeff Lancaster (Art Hotel) – design
 Jim Shea – photography 
 Mary Anne Frye – concept photography

Studios
 Recorded at Sunset Sound and Sound Labs (Hollywood, California).
 Mastered at A&M Studios (Hollywood, California).

Charts

References

Yellowjackets albums
1983 albums
Warner Records albums
Instrumental albums
Albums produced by Tommy LiPuma